Saint-Pierre-d'Entremont is a commune in the Isère department in the Auvergne-Rhône-Alpes region in southeastern France.

It lies in the parc naturel régional de Chartreuse.

Population

Main natural areas
 Grand Som (mountain, 2,026 m)
 Cirque de Saint-Même (waterfalls and natural circus)
 Dent de l'Ours (mountain, 1,820 m) 
 Lances de Malissard (mountain, 2,047m)

See also
Communes of the Isère department

References

Communes of Isère
Isère communes articles needing translation from French Wikipedia